The Association of Maldives  Engineers (AME) is a professional organization of engineers in the Maldives.  It was founded by Aravintharaj Chinnappa in 2018.  The AME joined the World Council of Civil Engineers in 2021.

References

External links 
 https://web.archive.org/web/20160409165533/http://www.wfeo.org/organizations/association-of-maldivian-engineers-ame/

2008 establishments in the Maldives
Engineering organizations
Professional associations based in the Maldives
Organizations established in 2008